Dragon Throne: Battle of Red Cliffs is a real-time strategy (RTS) video game developed by Object Software Limited (formerly known as Overmax Studios) in 2002 for the PC. It is based on the historical background of the epic 14th century novel Romance of the Three Kingdoms by Luo Guanzhong and the famous Battle of Red Cliffs (Battle of Chibi).

See also

 Three Kingdoms: Fate of the Dragon

External links 
 

2002 video games
Windows games
Windows-only games
Video games developed in China
Video games based on Romance of the Three Kingdoms
Real-time strategy video games
Strategy First games